Against All Authorities  is an extended play by American hardcore hip-hop group Onyx, released on May 5, 2015 by Goon MuSick. The whole album was produced by Canadian producer Scopic. The album features appearances by American rappers Sick Flo, Ras Kass, Jasia'n and Canadian rapper Merkules.

Against All Authorities was described by UndergroundHipHop.com as the best-selling CD album of May, named by HipHop4Real as the best EP of 2015 in "Best EP of 2015" and recognized by Hip-Hop Chamber as the best album of 2015 in "Best Album of 2015", beating Dr. Dre's album Compton.

Background 
Against All Authorities is a statement about the current situation in the US. Onyx uses their lyrical weaponry to shoot back at the system. Sticky Fingaz and Fredro Starr recorded a 6-track EP protesting against racial injustice and police brutality. This is straight-up dark and vintage hardcore hip-hop focusing on the murders and brutality showcased by the police force on African-Americans, racial tensions at their highest point.

Fredro detailed the concept of the release in an interview on White Label Radio:"...We giving you our side of this story. We angry because it could be me, it could be anybody in this room. Sad to say no matter how old you are. Every day we gotta turn on the news with a different person. Young men still got shot and murdered since we did that album. So I felt like it was time to actually just say something and be aggressive but make a point with our music. We coming from an angry perspective of niggas from Southside Queens who deal with the same shit every day. This is our protest!"

Production 
Black Lives Matter has given Fredro and Sticky some incredibly powerful motivation, and you can hear it all over the six tracks of this Scopic produced EP. The sound of this release is similar to the Onyx's second album All We Got Iz Us, released in 1995. The very first beat that Canadian producer Scopic sent to Fredro was "Look Like A Criminal":"...I sent this beat to everybody! Nobody wanted it. NOBODY!!!! Onyx gave it one listen and said 'YEP! We Rocking This! Let's make an EP together!'."

World tour 
In April 2015, in support of a new EP, Fredro and Sticky went on a world tour and visited 20 countries. Also were printed exclusive t-shirts and hoodies with album logos, "Molotov cocktail," and "The anarchy symbol.''

Singles 
The first single "Against All Authorities" was released on April 21, 2015. The song begins with a recording of Nebraska Senator Ernie Chambers comparing the U.S. police to ISIS, and then Sticky and Fredo assault us with in-your-face, politically astute aggression. It sounds like a call to action against corrupt governments, crooked cops and systematic oppression.

The second single "Strike Bac" featuring Sick Flo was released on April 29, 2015. Onyx encourage people to "strike back". The song is typically tough and grimey, with an appearance from Sick Flo. Fredro Starr about the concept of this songin an interview with Charlie Sloth:"...We just letting you know that police don't get no respect in the hood. We don't respect them because they don't respect us. We're not being ignorant about what we're saying. We being very upset about what's going on. This is Onyx way to expressing our feelings on wax."

Videos 
Snowgoons's DJ Sixkay made six visual videos for all tracks from this EP. Also, Onyx released two official music videos from this album: "Against All Authorities" and "Fuck Da Law." Both videos were shot by studio "Rome York," in Rome, Italy on April 20, 2015. Onyx dropped visuals for the song "Fuck Da Law" via 2DOPEBOYZ on the day the album was released. The video shows Sticky plays the role of a convict who escaped from prison. The second video, "Against All Authorities," was premiered on 2DOPEBOYZ on June 10, 2015. The video shows how Fredro and Sticky caught and crucified a police officer.

Track listing

Samples
Strike Bac
"I Have A Dream" speech by Martin Luther King Jr. (August 28, 1963.)

Against All Authorities
Speech by Nebraska's senator Ernie Chambers from Judiciary Committee Hearing on Allowing Guns in Bars (LB 635) (March 20, 2015):"...I wouldn’t go to Syria, I wouldn’t go to Iraq, I wouldn’t go to Afghanistan, I wouldn’t go to Yemen, I wouldn’t go to Tunisia, I wouldn’t go to Lebanon, I wouldn’t go to Jordan, I would do it right here. Nobody from ISIS ever terrorized us as a people as the police do us daily."

Black Fatigue
"Good Cop/Bad Cop" by Blahzay Blahzay (1996.)

Da Liquor Store
Speech by Eric Garner (The 43-year-old black man died on July 17, 2014, in New York City after a white officer placed him in a chokehold during an arrest for selling loose cigarettes):"...Get away [garbled] for what? Every time you see me, you want to mess with me. I'm tired of it. It stops today. Why would you...? Everyone standing here will tell you I didn't do nothing. I did not sell nothing. Because every time you see me, you want to harass me. You want to stop me [garbled] selling cigarettes. I'm minding my business, officer, I'm minding my business. Please just leave me alone. I told you the last time, please just leave me alone."

Fuck Da Law
Speech by Diane Sawyer on ABC News (February 7, 2013):"...10,000 law enforcement officers are trying to find a killer in Los Angeles, California. A sweeping manhunt, triggered by this man. A former policeman, accused of a shooting spree, targeting fellow cops and their families. And these images say it all. Police officers on the hunt for someone who knows their old codes, their moves. On highways, a request that commuters study license plates and call 911."

Awards
 Against All Authorities was described by UndergroundHipHop.com as the best-selling CD album of May.
 Against All Authorities was named by HipHop4Real as the best EP of 2015 in "Best EP of 2015".
 Against All Authorities was recognized by Hip-Hop Chamber as the best album of 2015 in "Best Album of 2015", beating Dr. Dre's album Compton.

References

External links 
Against All Authorities at RapGenius
Against All Authorities at Discogs
 
 

Onyx (group) albums
2015 EPs